Taneli Typpö (2 March 1878, Virolahti - 17 March 1960) was a Finnish farmer and politician. He was a member of the Parliament of Finland from 1909 to 1918 and again from 1922 to 1929, representing the Social Democratic Party of Finland (SDP). In 1918 he was imprisoned for having sided with the Reds during the Finnish Civil War.

References

1878 births
1960 deaths
People from Virolahti
People from Viipuri Province (Grand Duchy of Finland)
Social Democratic Party of Finland politicians
Members of the Parliament of Finland (1909–10)
Members of the Parliament of Finland (1910–11)
Members of the Parliament of Finland (1911–13)
Members of the Parliament of Finland (1913–16)
Members of the Parliament of Finland (1916–17)
Members of the Parliament of Finland (1917–19)
Members of the Parliament of Finland (1922–24)
Members of the Parliament of Finland (1924–27)
Members of the Parliament of Finland (1927–29)
People of the Finnish Civil War (Red side)
Prisoners and detainees of Finland